The South Dakota Amateur Baseball Hall of Fame is a museum in Lake Norden, South Dakota.

The museum presents a pictorial history of amateur baseball in South Dakota as well as memorabilia from about a dozen South Dakotans who played Major League Baseball.  It is described as the "pet project of USA TODAY baseball writer Mel Antonen," although Antonen is not involved in the day-to-day operations of the museum.

The primary purpose of the museum is to relate the history of baseball in South Dakota through permanent exhibits of photographs, uniforms, bats, balls, gloves, and other memorabilia.  The focus of displays is the development and accomplishments of South Dakotans who have participated in a number of different types and levels of amateur baseball including:

High School Baseball
College Baseball (NCAA and NAIA)
American Legion Baseball
Town Team Baseball

The South Dakota Amateur Baseball Hall of Fame is supported by charitable contributions from visitors and by way of local fundraisers.  It has not received significant financial support from professional baseball players.

The museum is located at 519 Main Street, Lake Norden, South Dakota 57248, and admission is free.

See also
 List of museums in South Dakota
Amateur baseball in the United States
Baseball awards #U.S. amateur baseball

References

Baseball in South Dakota
Baseball museums and halls of fame
Halls of fame in South Dakota
State sports halls of fame in the United States
Sports museums in South Dakota
Museums in Hamlin County, South Dakota
Amateur baseball in the United States